This is a list of events in Scottish television from 2006.

Events
January –  It is announced that Scottish Screen will amalgamate with the Scottish Arts Council to form the newly created Creative Scotland.
2 March – STV Group plc announce that Scottish Television will be known onscreen as STV. Grampian will also rebrand.
30 May – Scottish Television becomes known as STV Central and Grampian Television as STV North.
July – Launch of the STV website stv.tv.
29 August – SMG officially rejects a merger offer from Northern Irish ITV franchise holder UTV. The merger approach would have given SMG shareholders a 52% stake in the combined company.

Debuts

BBC
10 February – That Was The Team That Was on BBC One (2006–2008)

Television series
Scotsport (1957–2008)
Reporting Scotland (1968–1983; 1984–present)
Scotland Today (1972–2009)
Sportscene (1975–present)
The Beechgrove Garden (1978–present)
Grampian Today (1980–2009) (rebranded as North Tonight)
Taggart (1983–2010)
Only an Excuse? (1993–2020)
Still Game (2002–2007; 2016–2019)
River City (2002–present)
Politics Now (2004–2011)
VideoGaiden (2005–2008)
The Adventure Show (2005–present)

Ending this year
Unknown – The Karen Dunbar Show (2003–2006)

Deaths
6 July – Tom Weir, 91, cricketer, author, and broadcaster

See also
2006 in Scotland

References

 
Television in Scotland by year
2000s in Scottish television